Forked Run State Park is a public recreation area located  south of Reedsville in eastern Meigs County, Ohio, United States. The name is pronounced with two syllables for "Fork-ed". It fronts on Ohio State Route 124. The park borders the Shade River State Forest, from which it was created in 1951. The dam was created in 1952, when the park was opened to the public.

Park features include campground, rustic cabins, picnic facilities, hiking trails, swimming beach, boat ramps, and disc golf course. It also is located close to an Ohio River boat ramp, so the campground also serves Ohio River boaters.

References

External links
Forked Run State Park Ohio Department of Natural Resources
Forked Run State Park Map Ohio Department of Natural Resources 

Protected areas of Meigs County, Ohio
State parks of Ohio
State forests of the Appalachians
Protected areas established in 1951
1951 establishments in Ohio